Shelley Nicole Payne (born 3 January 1972) was elected to the Western Australian Legislative Council as a Labor Party member for Agricultural region at the 2021 state election for a four-year term beginning on 22 May 2021.

Payne was previously a chemical engineer and councilor for the Esperance shire after moving from Canada. She was also a candidate in the 2019 federal election for the seat of O'Connor.

She lives with her husband Mark and their 3 teenage children.

References 

Living people
Members of the Western Australian Legislative Council
Place of birth missing (living people)
Australian Labor Party members of the Parliament of Western Australia
21st-century Australian politicians
Women members of the Western Australian Legislative Council
1972 births
21st-century Australian women politicians